Ram Krishna Yadav (Nepali: राम कृष्ण यादव) is a Nepali politician of Nepali Congress and was Agriculture minister in Deuba cabinet. He is also central committee member of Nepali Congress and one of the rising youth politician of the party. He is also servind as member of the 1st Constituent Assembly and 2nd Constituent Assembly from Dhanusha-2. He joined Deuba cabinet on 26 July 2017 as Minister for Agriculture Development. In the 2022 Nepalese general election, he was elected as the member of the 2nd Federal Parliament of Nepal.

Electoral history 
Yadav remained victorious in 2008 and 2013 election but lost in 2017 due to pro-Madhesh party alliance and left alliance. The caste factor within Yadavs also played important role. Argariya who was in Nepal Loktantrik Forum which joined Nepali Congress ahead election but Argariya contested election from FSF-N. As a result, even party votes went to Argariya while UML provided external support.

Election in the 2010s

2017 legislative elections

2013 Constituent Assembly election

Election in the 2000s

2008 Constituent Assembly election

See also 

 Bimalendra Nidhi 
 Mahendra Yadav
 Ananda Prasad Dhungana

References 

Nepali Congress politicians from Madhesh Province
Nepal MPs 2017–2022
Government ministers of Nepal
Living people
People from Dhanusha District
Madhesi people
Nepalese Hindus
Tribhuvan University alumni
Members of the 1st Nepalese Constituent Assembly
Members of the 2nd Nepalese Constituent Assembly
Nepal MPs 2022–present
1962 births